Mikhaylovo is a rural locality (a village) in Kovarditskoye Rural Settlement, Muromsky District, Vladimir Oblast, Russia. The population was 25 as of 2010. There are 2 streets.

Geography 
Okheyevo is the nearest rural locality.

References 

Rural localities in Muromsky District
Melenkovsky Uyezd